Jesús Ortega Martínez (born November 5, 1952 in Aguascalientes) is a Mexican Centre-left politician affiliated with the Party of the Democratic Revolution (PRD) who has served in the lower and upper house of the Mexican Congress.    He was elected President of the PRD in 2008, and was succeeded by Jesús Zambrano Grijalva in 2011.

Political career
Ortega grew up in Aguascalientes; he moved to Mexico City to study in the Escuela Nacional de Ciencias Biológicas of the National Polytechnic Institute (IPN).  He became a member of the extinct Partido Socialista de los Trabajadores (PST) which he represented in the Chamber of Deputies during the LI Legislature (1979–1982); he later joined the Partido Mexicano Socialista (PMS) and from 1988 to 1991 (LIV Legislature) he served in the lower house of the Congress this time representing the PMS.

Ortega and his former party, the PMS, were one of the supporters of the Cuauhtémoc Cárdenas candidacy for the 1988 Mexican presidential election hence he became a member and founder of the Party of the Democratic Revolution.  As a member of the PRD he was elected to serve in the Chamber of Deputies during the LVI Legislature.

In 1996 Andrés Manuel López Obrador and Ortega ran for president and general secretary of the PRD; they won the PRD internal elections and served (Ortega as general secretary) for three years (1996–1999).  In 2000 he gained a seat in the upper house of the Congress.   In 2005 he lost against Marcelo Ebrard the PRD candidacy for Head of Government of the Federal District.

In 2008 Ortega ran for President of the PRD. Election results were controversial. Both leading candidates, Alejandro Encinas and Ortega, accused each other of fraud.  After several internal disputes Ortega was declared the winner.  He began serving as the PRD president until late 2008.

References

1952 births
Living people
Presidents of the Party of the Democratic Revolution
Members of the Chamber of Deputies (Mexico)
Members of the Senate of the Republic (Mexico)
Instituto Politécnico Nacional alumni
Politicians from Aguascalientes
20th-century Mexican politicians
21st-century Mexican politicians
Members of the Constituent Assembly of Mexico City